Accent on Youth may refer to:

 Accent on Youth (play), a 1934 Broadway play written by Samson Raphaelson
 Accent on Youth (film), a 1935 American comedy film, based on the play
 Accent on Youth (TV series), an Australian music variety television series